Synne Sun Løes  ( born 30 May 1975) is a Norwegian novelist and children's writer. She made her literary debut in 1999 with the novel Yoko er alene. She was awarded the Brage Prize in 2002 for the children's book Å spise blomster til frokost.

References

1975 births
Living people
Norwegian women novelists
20th-century Norwegian novelists
Norwegian children's writers
South Korean emigrants to Norway
Norwegian adoptees
20th-century Norwegian women writers